HLA-B39 (B39) is an HLA-B serotype. The serotype identifies the more common HLA-B*39 gene products.

B39 is a split antigen of the broad antigen B16, and is a sister type of B38.  B39 is most commonly found on the west pacific rim, in Japan and highest frequency in the new world. In Europe it is found in Scandinavia and Northern Russia.

Serotype

The serology for the most common B39 alleles, B*3901 and B*3906 is good, but some allele products are not well detected. Given the differential involvement of these alleles in disease testing should involve high resolution typing.

Alleles

Disease
B39 is suggested as a factor in Takayasu's arteritis and gallstones in Mexico. Osteoarticular complications of 
brucellosis appear to be associated with B39.  An association with spondylarthropathies and psoriatic arthritis was observed in several studies. Psoriatic arthritis appears to be linked to MICA-A9 which tightly linked to HLA-B39. B39 also appears to be involved in the Fishers syndrome variant of Guillain–Barré syndrome.

B39 appears to be protective against cardiomyopathy in Chaga's disease indicating a possible selective factor in its rise in the New World. Chaga's disease is caused by a trypanosome carried by a blood sucking insect found in tropical, palm growing regions.

Southern California now reports cases of Chaga's disease from contaminated transfusions and may be already a habitat for the vector.

In Takayasu's arteritis
Takayasu's arteritis appears to have a link to B39.  The association with B*3902 increases risk of pulmonary infarction, ischemic heart disease, aortic regurgitation, systemic hypertension, renal artery stenosis, cerebrovascular disease, and visual disturbance. B*3906, common in indigenous Mesoamericans has been found associated with the same disease.

References

3